Solo 2: Abstractions is a solo piano album by Franco D'Andrea. It was recorded in 2001 and released by Philology Records.

Recording and music
Material for this and seven other solo piano CDs was recorded over the period of three mornings and two afternoons in April 2001. The tracks are free jazz pieces.

Release and reception

Solo 2 was released by Philology Records. The AllMusic reviewer concluded: "The adventuresome spirit throughout this recording will have piano lovers going back again and again to appreciate new facets within this gem of a release."

Track listing
"Mixed"
"Abstract Rhythms"
"Thirds"
"On the Edge"
"Area N. 1"
"Fifths and More"
"Via Libera"
"Area N. 4"
"Area N. 3"
"Empty Spaces"
"Area N. 5"
"Area N. 2"

Personnel
Franco D'Andrea – piano

References

Franco D'Andrea albums
Solo piano jazz albums